Samuel W. Soulé (January 25, 1830 – July 12, 1875), along with Christopher Sholes and Carlos Gliddin, was the inventor of the first practical typewriter at a machine shop located in Milwaukee, Wisconsin, US in 1869.

References 

19th-century American inventors
People from Milwaukee
1830 births
1875 deaths